Ectemnius rufifemur is a species of square-headed wasp in the family Crabronidae. It is found in Central America and North America.

Subspecies
These two subspecies belong to the species Ectemnius rufifemur:
 Ectemnius rufifemur orizabinus Leclercq, 1968
 Ectemnius rufifemur rufifemur (Packard, 1866)

References

Crabronidae
Articles created by Qbugbot
Insects described in 1866